Manu Delago (born 31 July 1984) is an Austrian Hang player, percussionist and composer based in London.

Biography 

Delago was born in Innsbruck, Tyrol, and took music lessons as a child in accordion and piano. As a teenager he mainly played drums for various rock bands. In 2003 he picked up the Hang, which gradually turned into one of his main musical instruments. 

After graduating from the Mozarteum, Innsbruck, in classical percussion, Delago moved to London and studied jazz drums at the Guildhall School of Music & Drama, beginning his focus on the Swiss instrument, Hang. Later he studied composition at the Trinity College of Music in London. After completing his studies, he worked as a composer, ensemble leader and musician. Since 2007 he has performed internationally in more than fifty countries on six continents  
including prestigious venues such as the Royal Albert Hall, Roundhouse, Royal Festival Hall and Barbican in London, Carnegie Hall in New York, the Sydney Opera House and Fuji Rock Festival in Japan.

Career 

Between 2000 and 2007 Delago was working as live and studio drummer for various Austrian bands such as HotchPotch, Zabine, Michael Tschuggnall, Nadine Beiler, Bluatschink and more. 

In 2006, after playing together in different bands, Delago and Christoph Pepe Auer founded the first Hang and Bass Clarinet duo in the world called Living Room. The duo has released two albums and a YouTube series called Hang & Bass Clarinet Megahits. 
He also regularly tours with his own Manu Delago Handmade and 'Manu Delago Ensemble'. 
Delago has also collaborated with artists including Björk, Anoushka Shankar, Ólafur Arnalds, Shpongle, Ellie Goulding, Bugge Wesseltoft, Giannis Charoulis, Nitin Sawhney, Stuart McCallum, Cevanne Horrocks-Hopayian, Boris Grebenshchikov, and many more. 
He appeared as a soloist with the London Symphony Orchestra strings, Britten Sinfonia, Metropol Orkest, Aurora Orchestra, Münchner Kammerorchester, Züricher Kammerorchester and various other orchestras. His solo piece Mono Desire was listed in the Top30 best-rated music videos on YouTube.

Delago has featured as percussionist and hang player for several of Björk's shows, starting with the Biophilia Tour up until the Cornucopia performances. He also performed percussion with The Cinematic Orchestra from 2014-2016.

He was a composer and producer for Anoushka Shankar's 2016 album Land of Gold. He also accompanied her on her world tour.

In 2018 Manu Delago released Parasol Peak – a multi-award winning album and film in which Manu Delago leads an ensemble of seven musicians on a mountaineering expedition in the Alps. 

After years of touring, Manu felt it was important to do his bit towards sustainability by launching the carbon neutral Recycling Tour in 2021, performing venues across Germany and Austria, accessed only by bicycles.

Discography

Albums 
 2021 - Manu Delago - Environ Me
 2020 - Manu Delago - Circadian Live
 2019 - Manu Delago - Circadian
 2018 - Manu Delago - Parasol Peak
 2018 - Manu Delago - Metromonk Unplugged EP
 2017 - Manu Delago - Metromonk
 2015 - Manu Delago - Silver Kobalt
 2013 - Manu Delago - Bigger Than Home
 2012 - Manu Delago & London Symphony Orchestra strings - Manuscripts
 2010 - Living Room (Christoph Pepe Auer & Manu Delago) - Colouring Book
 2010 - Manu Delago - Made in Silence 2
 2008 - Manu Delago - Adventions
 2007 - Manu Delago - Handmade
 2007 - Christoph Pepe Auer & Manu Delago - Living Room
 2006 - Manu Delago - Made in Silence

Features 
 2016 - Land of Gold - Aoushka Shankar
 2016 - Vulnicura live - Björk
 2013 - The Epiphany of Mrs Kugla - Shpongle
 2013 - A long way - Andreya Triana
 2013 - Traces of You - Anoushka Shankar
 2011 - Virus - Björk
 2009 - Nothing is something worth doing - Shpongle
 2009 - Live in Concert - Shpongle (DVD)
 2008 - Arigato - Boris Grebenshchikov

Further compositions 

 2015 - Newton's Rainbow (hang, sarod & string orchestra)
 2014 - Secret Corridor (hang, electronics & string quartet)
 2012 - Concertino Grosso (hang & string orchestra)
 2012 - CHS (hang & female choir in six parts)
 2011 - Chaos_Equalibrium (string quartet & dance)
 2010 - Why does one hide from six? (Würfelspiel für gemischtes Ensemble - dice game for a mixed ensemble)
 2009 - Pencilphonie No. 1 in Hb2 (a self-portrait for pencil, eraser & sharpener)
 2009 - 5 ft 12 (Marimba solo)
 2009 - Los Cepillos de Dientes (music for 2 acoustic toothbrushes)
 2007 - If you’re really right, will be proved by the light (3 players on 2 marimbas)

References

External links 
 
Living Room London at St. Luke's

1984 births
Living people
Musicians from Innsbruck
Austrian percussionists
Austrian jazz composers
Male jazz composers